The 2010 Churchill Cup, the eighth edition of an annual international rugby union tournament, was taking place in the Denver and New York City metropolitan areas. This was the second consecutive year in which Denver was a host city, and the third in a row for the competition to be held in the United States.

Competitors
The three regular participants in the event — the senior national sides of the USA and Canada, and England's "A" (second-level) national side, the England Saxons — were joined by three first-time competitors:
 
  (senior side)
  (senior side)

Format
The teams played in a round-robin format between two pools to decide the elimination matches. All six teams participated on the finals day: the two pool winners competed in the Cup Final, the two runners-up played in a Plate Final, and the two bottom-placed teams met in the Bowl Final.

Venues
After the 2008 tournament, which was played both in Canada and the United States, in 2009 all rounds of the tournament as well as the Finals Day were played around the Denver, Colorado area which was the future home for the tournament until the 2012 edition. The first three days of round-robin play were at the modern, purpose-built rugby stadium  Infinity Park in Glendale, Colorado on the south side of Denver. For the first time in the tournament's history the finals were held at Red Bull Arena in Harrison, New Jersey, which is home to New York's MLS team, the New York Red Bulls.

Fixtures and results

Pool stage

Pool A

Pool B

Finals

Bowl final

Plate final

Cup final

See also
Churchill Cup

2010
2010 rugby union tournaments for national teams
International rugby union competitions hosted by the United States
2009–10 in English rugby union
2009–10 in French rugby union
2010 in American rugby union
2010 in Canadian rugby union
2010 in Russian rugby union
rugby union